Emamiyeh-ye Yek (also Romanized as Emāmīyeh-ye Yek; also known as Emāmīyeh-ye Avval) is a village in Fahraj Rural District, in the Central District of Fahraj County, Kerman Province, Iran. At the 2006 census, its population was 102, in 30 families.

References 

Populated places in Fahraj County